Yarkand, Yarkent, and Yarkant are spelling variants and may refer to:

 Yarkant County, a county and historical town in Xinjiang Uyghur Autonomous Region, China
 Yarkent Khanate, a Uyghur Khanate in existence 1514–1705
 Yarkand (area), a historical area (1759–1882) in Xinjiang during the Qing dynasty
 Yarkand River, a river in the Xinjiang Uyghur Autonomous Region of western China

See also
 Battle of Yarkand, April 1934
 Yarkand hare
 Yarkand deer